Parry Passage is a strait and marine waterway between Langara Island (N) and Graham Island (S) in Haida Gwaii, formerly known as the Queen Charlotte Islands, in British Columbia, Canada.

Name origin and history

Also called Parry Channel, the passage was named for William E. Parry, the explorer.

Joseph Ingraham in 1791–1792 named it "Cunneyah's Streights" [sic] after the chief of nearby Kiusta. Jacinto Caamano named it Puerto de Floridablanca in 1792 after the Conde de Floridablanca.

The Haida village of Dadens was located on the south end of Langara Island, facing the passage.

See also
Parry (disambiguation)

References

Straits of British Columbia
Landforms of Haida Gwaii